Robert Nicholas Crush (born 23 March 1954) is an English pianist, songwriter, actor and television presenter, originally from Leyton in East London.

Biography

Bobby Crush first came to public attention after six winning appearances on Hughie Green's British ITV talent show, Opportunity Knocks, in 1972. He received the Variety Club of Great Britain award for Best New Artist of 1972.
He recorded for the Philips label in the UK and his recordings were produced by Norman Newell, who had previously worked with Shirley Bassey, Judy Garland, Johnny Mathis and Crush's role model, Russ Conway.

By the age of 18, Crush had starred at the London Palladium having already achieved an album in the top 20 and a single, "Borsalino", in the top 40.

His West End successes include three seasons at the London Palladium (guest starring with Jack Jones, Vic Damone and Dame Julie Andrews). As a regular performer at that venue, Crush's name appeared on the "Roll of Honour" at the Palladium's stage door. He also played a year at the Victoria Palace with Max Bygraves in SwingalongaMax, has appeared at The Royal Variety Performance and starred in his own one-man show at London's Fortune Theatre.

His work overseas includes a tour of Canada with Sir Harry Secombe in The London Palladium Show, concerts in Australia and New Zealand, as well as performing in cabaret on cruise liners.

His television appearances include Sounds Like Music, a British game show that aired on ITV from 6 June 1989 to 11 May 1990 in which Crush was the show's host. He has appeared on countless other TV programmes over the last five decades. His most recent TV appearances have been in the ITV sitcom Benidorm, in which he played the character Billy Sparkle. Crush was also featured on the ITV series Last Laugh in Vegas, in which eight British acts from the 1960s and 70s were flown to Las Vegas to make their American debuts.

Theatrical roles include Liberace in Liberace's Suit (Jermyn Street Theatre), Dr Frank N. Furter in The Rocky Horror Show, Billy Flynn in Chicago, Vernon Gersch in They're Playing our Song, L.M. in "Pump Boys and Dinettes" and Liberace in Liberace, Live from Heaven (Leicester Square Theatre / New Zealand tour / Edinburgh Festival). Bobby also co-starred with Ray Quinn in the 2018 tour of Summer Holiday, the Musical playing the role of Jerry.

Crush's radio broadcasts include his own week of shows on BBC Radio 2 and as guest contributor on many other radio programmes, such as Ken Bruce's Radio 2 show, choosing "The Tracks of My Years".

Crush's recordings include his debut album Bobby Crush, which reached no. 15 in the UK Albums Chart, and chart singles "Borsalino" and "The Sting". He has made 13 studio albums as a pianist, not including compilations. His Double Decker Party Album, which was TV-advertised, sold 100,000 copies and brought him a double gold disc. The Piano Party album also went gold in New Zealand. Crush is featured as a vocalist on Pickwick's Joseph and the Amazing Technicolor Dreamcoat playing the role of Pharaoh, and on songs from the musical Hair for Carlton Records.

Following the release of his album Reel Music, Crush played a 30-date tour with Gene Pitney, including a night at the London Palladium. Other career highlights include "The Stonewall Equality Show" at the Royal Albert Hall and a tour of Back to Bacharach, Crush's tribute show to Burt Bacharach, for which he also wrote the script.

Crush has appeared in 37 pantomimes, starting out initially in principal boy parts, but is now in demand for dame roles. In January 2021, in recognition of the 37 pantomimes since his first in 1973, Crush was inducted into the Panto Archive Hall of Fame, an honour bestowed on only a handful of entertainers.

As a composer, Crush has written three pantomime scores, a musical (Sherwood) and comedy material for Russ Abbot and Les Dennis & Dustin Gee. His greatest success as a songwriter was penning the music and lyrics for Keith Harris and Orville's hit "Orville's Song" (also known as "I Wish I Could Fly"), which reached no. 4 in the UK Singles Chart, sold a quarter of a million copies and brought Crush a silver disc.

A tour with 4 Poofs and a Piano, for whom he also wrote, took place between February and April 2013.

On 23 March 2014, Crush celebrated his 60th birthday with a gala concert at the Leicester Square Theatre, London

He continues to tour extensively and is a regular at the West End cabaret venue Crazy Coqs in Piccadilly and The Pheasantry in Chelsea.

Personal life
Crush came out publicly as gay in an interview with Gay Times in 2004. He lives in London's West End and is currently preparing his autobiography, with the aim to publish it in 2023 to coincide with his 50 years in showbiz anniversary.

Chart discography

Albums

Bobby Crush (1972) – UK no. 15
The Bobby Crush Incredible Double Decker (1982) – UK no. 53
All Time Piano Hits
Piano Party
Smash Hits including The Sting
35 Piano Pops
Honky Tonk Favourites
Hits of the Thirties
Music, Music, Music!
Bobby Crush plays Elton John
First Love
Hollywood and Broadway
Reel Music (Melodies from the Movies)
The Best of Bobby Crush
Bobby Crush: The Definitive Collection

Singles

"Borsalino" b/w "The Stripper" (1972) – UK no. 37
"The Good Old Bad Old Days" (1973)
"The Gondolas of Venice" (1973)
"The Sting " (1974)
"Mayday" (1974)
"Hangin' Out" (1974)
"The Chinese Bicycle" (1976)
"Lonely Ballerina" (1984)
"Brendan's Theme" (1984)

References

External links
Official website
: Bill Buckley & Bobby Crush, at BBC Berkshire

1954 births
English pianists
Living people
21st-century pianists
English gay musicians
20th-century English LGBT people
21st-century English LGBT people